Jānis Brikmanis (25 February 1940 – 18 April 2019) was a Latvian zoologist, environmental conservationist, radio and television presenter, and writer.

Career
Jānis Brikmanis studied at the department of biology at the Latvian State University from 1960 to 1965. He was the captain of the university's rock climbing team. After graduation he worked at the chemical plant in Olaine before he got a teaching position at the Daugavpils Pedagogical Institute in 1970. From 1975, he worked for the Gauja National Park as an engineer zoologist and senior researcher.

Over a period of 35 years, Brikmanis was a public figure in Latvia as the presenter of several radio and television programs about animal life, in particular about birds. He could imitate the sounds of different birds and gained the nickname Putnu Jānis, meaning "Bird Jānis". He wrote four books about nature.

In 2015, he received the Cross of Recognition from the Latvian state, in recognition of his lifelong contribution to environmental protection and promotion.

Personal life
He was married to Vija Brikmane whom he met in Daugavpils when he was a lecturer and she was a student. The couple had four children. From 1995 to 1998 he was the leader of the Congregation of Latvian Dievturi, a Baltic neopagan organisation. He died from cancer on 18 April 2019.

References

Notes

Sources

 
 
 

1940 births
2019 deaths
20th-century zoologists
Ornithological writers
Nature writers
Latvian biologists
Latvian radio presenters
Latvian television personalities
Latvian male writers
20th-century Latvian writers
Latvian non-fiction writers
Latvian modern pagans
Modern pagan religious leaders
Recipients of the Cross of Recognition
Deaths from cancer in Latvia
Male non-fiction writers
Soviet zoologists
Latvian zoologists